Lesley O'Halloran (born 1 November 1965) is a former professional tennis player from Ireland.

Biography
A left-handed player from Dublin, O'Halloran played college tennis in the United States before turning professional.

From 1986 to 1998 she featured in 32 Fed Cup ties for Ireland, winning 20 matches, 5 in singles and 15 in doubles.

On the international circuit she was most successful in doubles, with a best ranking of 113 in the world. Her best performance on the WTA Tour was a quarter-final appearance in the doubles at the 1989 Virginia Slims of Houston. She made it into the women's doubles main draw at the 1989 Wimbledon Championships, as a lucky loser from qualifying, with American partner Leigh-Anne Eldredge. The pair reached the second round.

O'Halloran now coaches at the Donnybrook Lawn Tennis Club in Dublin. She has competed on the ITF senior circuit and finished 2012 as the world's top ranked player in both singles and doubles for the 45's.

ITF finals

Doubles (4-8)

References

External links
 
 
 

1965 births
Living people
Irish female tennis players
Tennis players from Dublin (city)